Gaotang is a town of Hua County in eastern Shaanxi province, China, located about  southeast of downtown Weinan on the northern slopes of the Qin Mountains. , it has 41 villages under its administration.

References 

Township-level divisions of Shaanxi